An Old Frisian farmhouse is a small unit farmhouse (Wohnstallhaus) that combined the farmer's living area and animals' stalls, and had limited space for storing harvest products. It was widely distributed across the North German Plain until the middle of the 17th century and was the forerunner of the Gulf house.

Gallery

See also
 Old Frisian longhouse

References

Vernacular architecture
Architecture in Frisia
Agriculture in Germany
Houses in Germany
Farmhouses